Murian (also Romanized as Mūrīān, Mūrīyān, and Mūreyān; also known as Mūrīān-e Şaleḩābād, Hūrīān, and Şāleḩābād) is a village in Dorudfaraman Rural District, in the Central District of Kermanshah County, Kermanshah Province, Iran. At the 2006 census, its population was 297, in 55 families.

References 

Populated places in Kermanshah County